Invasion of Russia can refer to:

 Mongol invasion of Kievan Rus' (1237–1242), a series of invasions that resulted in the Rus' states becoming vassals of the Golden Horde.
 Livonian campaign against Rus' (1240–1242), an unsuccessful Teutonic invasion of the Novgorod and Pskov Republics, in order to convert them to Catholicism.
 Russo-Crimean Wars (1570–1572), an Ottoman invasion that penetrated Russia and destroyed Moscow.
 Polish–Muscovite War (1609–1618), Poland gained Severia and Smolensk.
 Ingrian War (1610–1617), a Swedish invasion which captured Novgorod and Pskov.
 Swedish invasion of Russia (1708–1709), an unsuccessful Swedish invasion, as part of the Great Northern War (1700–1721).
 French invasion of Russia (1812), an unsuccessful invasion by Napoleon's French Empire and its allies, as part of the Napoleonic Wars (1803–1815).
 Crimean War (1853–1856), a series of conflicts between the Ottoman Empire, the British Empire, the French Empire, Sardinia, and the Russian Empire, including an Allied invasion of the Crimean Peninsula.
 Japanese invasion of Sakhalin (1905), an invasion and annexation by the Japanese, as part of the Russo-Japanese War (1904–1905).
 Eastern Front (World War I) (1914–1918), Russia was forced to cede Ukraine, Belarus, and the Baltic states to Germany as the Russian Empire collapsed.
 Caucasus campaign (1914–1918), a series of conflicts between the Russian Empire, its various successor states, and the Ottoman Empire during World War I. 
 Allied intervention in the Russian Civil War (1918–1925) and the contemporaneous Polish–Soviet War (1918/9–1921), the Polish occupation of Belarus and West Ukraine.
 Japanese intervention in Siberia (1918–1922), an occupation of the Russian Far East by Japanese soldiers during the Russian Civil War (1917–1923).
 Operation Barbarossa (1941), an unsuccessful invasion of the Soviet Union led by Nazi Germany that started the Eastern Front (World War II) of 1941–1945.
 Continuation War (1941–1944), an unsuccessful German-Finnish invasion of the Soviet Union, as part of World War II.
 Kantokuen (1941), an aborted plan for a major Japanese invasion of the Russian Far East during World War II.
 Operation Unthinkable (1945), a proposed contingency plan for an Anglo-American invasion of the Soviet Union developed by the British Chiefs of Staff during the later stages of World War II.
 War of Dagestan (1999), a repulsed Chechen invasion of Dagestan.

See also
 Polish invasion of Russia (disambiguation)
 Russian invasion (disambiguation)
 Soviet invasion (disambiguation)
 Russian Expeditionary Force (disambiguation)